The Via Egnatia was a road constructed by the Romans in the 2nd century BC. It crossed Illyricum, Macedonia, and Thracia, running through territory that is now part of modern Albania, North Macedonia, Greece, and European Turkey as a continuation of the Via Appia.

Starting at Dyrrachium (now Durrës) on the Adriatic Sea, the road followed a difficult route along the river Genusus (Shkumbin), over the Candaviae (Jablanica) mountains and thence to the highlands around Lake Ohrid. It then turned south, following several high mountain passes to reach the northern coastline of the Aegean Sea at Thessalonica. From there it ran through Thrace to the city of Byzantium (later Constantinople, now Istanbul). It covered a total distance of about 1,120 km (696 miles/746 Roman miles). Like other major Roman roads, it was about six metres (19.6 ft) wide, paved with large polygonal stone slabs or covered with a hard layer of sand.

Construction and usage 
The main literary sources for the construction of the road are Strabo's Geographica and a number of milestones found along the route's length, marking the road for a length of 860 kilometres as far as the border between Macedonia and Thrace. Bilingual inscriptions on the milestones record that Gnaeus Egnatius, proconsul of Macedonia, ordered its construction, though the exact date is uncertain; the road presumably took its name from its builder. It may have succeeded an earlier military road from Illyria to Byzantium, as described by Polybius and Cicero, which the Romans apparently built over and/or improved.

The Via Egnatia was constructed in order to link a chain of Roman colonies stretching from the Adriatic Sea to the Bosphorus. The termini of the Via Egnatia and the Via Appia, leading from Rome itself, were almost directly opposite each other on the east and west shores of the Adriatic Sea. The route, thus gave the colonies of the southern Balkans a direct connection to Rome. It was also a vital link to Roman territories further to the east; until a more northerly route across Illyria was opened under Augustus it was Rome's main link with her empire in the eastern Mediterranean. It was repaired and expanded several times but experienced lengthy periods of neglect due to Rome's civil wars.

The road was used by the Apostle Paul on his second missionary journey as he traveled from Philippi to Thessalonica (Acts 16–17). It also played a vital role in several key moments in Roman history: the armies of Julius Caesar and Pompey marched along the Via Egnatia during Caesar's civil war, and during the Liberators' civil war Mark Antony and Octavian pursued Cassius and Brutus along the Via Egnatia to their fateful meeting at the Battle of Philippi. Surviving milestones record that the emperor Trajan undertook extensive repairs of the road prior to his campaign of 113 against the Parthians. However, by the 5th century AD the road had largely fallen into disuse as a result of violent instability in the region. A 5th-century historian noted that the western sections of the Via Egnatia were in such a poor state that travellers could barely pass along it.

In later years, the Via Egnatia was revived as a key road of the Eastern Roman Empire; Procopius records repairs made by Eastern Roman emperor Justinian I during the 6th century, though even then the dilapidated road was said to be virtually unusable during wet weather. Almost all Byzantine overland trade with western Europe traveled along the Via Egnatia. During the Crusades, armies traveling to the east by land followed the road to Constantinople before crossing into Asia Minor. In the aftermath of the Fourth Crusade, control of the road was vital for the survival of the Latin Empire as well as the Byzantine successor states the Empire of Nicaea and the Despotate of Epirus.

Post-Roman usage
During the first European conquests of Ottoman Turks sol kol (lit. left arm) was following the Via Egnatia.

Today's modern highway, Egnatia Odos, runs in parallel to the Via Egnatia between Thessaloniki and the Turkish border on the Evros river. Its name means "Via Egnatia" in Greek, alluding to its ancient counterpart.

Key towns along the Via Egnatia
Listed from west to east:

References

Further reading
 1994. "94/692/EC: Commission Decision of 17 May 1994 Concerning the Grant of Assistance from the Cohesion Financial Instrument to the Stage of Project Concerning the Construction of Via Egnatia - Igoumenitsa-Pedini Section - Subsection Vrosina (Psilorachi)-Pedini in Greece". Official Journal of the European Communities. Legislation. 37, no. 277: 66. 
 Amore, M G, L Bejko, Y Cerova, and I Gjipali. 2005. "Archaeological Reports and Notes - Via Egnatia (Albania) Project: Results of Fieldwork 2002". Journal of Roman Archaeology. 18: 336. 
 Attekum, Marietta van, and Holger de Bruin. Via Egnatia on Foot: A Journey into History. Driebergen: Via Egnatia Foundation, 2014. 
 Collart, Paul. 1935. "Une réfection de la « Via Egnatia » sous Trajan". Bulletin De Correspondence Hellénique. 59, no. 1: 395–415. .
 Michele Fasolo: La via Egnatia I. Da Apollonia e Dyrrachium ad Herakleia Lynkestidos, Istituto Grafico Editoriale Romano, 2nd ed., Roma 2005. (See also http://www.viaegnatia.net )
 Gunaropulu, Lukrētia, and Miltiadēs B. Chatzopulos. Les milliaires de la voie égnatienne entre Héraclée des Lyncestes et Thessalonique. 1985. Modern Greek. Series: Meletēmata / Kentron Hellēnikēs kai Rōmaïkēs Archaiotētos, 1. OCLC: 159882150.
 Heywood, Colin, and Elizabeth Zachariadou. The Via Egnatia in the Ottoman Period: The Menzilhānes of the Ṣol Ḳol in the Late 17th/Early 18th Century. Rethymnon: Crete University Press, 1996. 
 Kazazaki, Zoe. Monasteries of the Via Egnatia. [Heraklion Crete (Greece)]: [Greek Ministry of Culture], 1999.  (v.1);  (v.1).
 Kollaros, G. A., E. G. Varagouli-Xidaki, A. G. Athanasopoulou-Kollarou, and G. S. Xidakis. 1988. "Via Egnatia: A Modern Engineering Approach to an Ancient Highway". The Engineering Geology of Ancient Works, Monuments and Historical Sites, Rotterdam, 1988. 3: 1705–1713. 
 Lolos, Yannis. 2007. "Via Egnatia after Egnatius: Imperial Policy and Inter-regional Contacts". Mediterranean Historical Review. 22, no. 2: 273–293. . Abstract: The Via Egnatia, which linked Dyrrachium to Kypsela and ultimately to Byzantium/Constantinople, was the first Roman highway to be built east of the Adriatic. The studies published so far on this important road are devoted almost exclusively to its military importance, particularly during the Roman Republic. This author's goal instead was to assess the importance of the Egnatia at a political, social, and cultural level, by examining written sources (literary and epigraphical) and material remains. The article looks into the policy of Roman emperors regarding the Egnatia, and the role of the Via as a factor of commercial, social, and cultural interaction between the Italian peninsula and the Greek world, as well as among the cities and regions that it crossed. It also shows the contribution of the Egnatia to the spectacular development of certain cities and the parallel weakening of others, together with its impact upon the rural landscape.
 O'Sullivan, Firmin. The Egnatian Way. Newton Abbot: David and Charles, 1972. 264 pages.
 Romiopoulou, Catherine. 1974. "Un nouveau milliaire de la Via Egnatia". Bulletin De Correspondence Hellénique. 98, no. 2: 813–816.
 Samsaris, Dim.  Δ. Κ. Σαμσάρης, Pennana, Ένας ρωμαϊκός σταθμός (mutatio) της Εγνατίας οδού, Dodona 15 (1986), 1, σ. 69–84. 
 Sande, Siri. 2004. "The Petropigi Fortress: A Late Byzantine and Early Ottoman "Statio" on the Via Egnatia". Interaction and Isolation in Late Byzantine Culture / Ed. by Jan Olof Rosenqvist. 89–99. .
 Tafel, Gottlieb Lukas Friedrich. De via Romanorum militari Egnatia qua Illyricum Macedonia et Thracia iungebantur: diss. geographica. 1837. 
 Votýpka-Pecha, Josef, and Ladislav Vidman. 1959. "VIA EGNATIA MEZI ELBASANEM A OCHRIDSKÝM JEZEREM". Listy Filologické / Folia Philologica. 82, no. 2: 187–196. . Language: Czech. Abstract: Cette étude est l'œuvre de deux auteurs don't l'un (J. Votýpka-Pecha), en tant que médecin de l'expédition géologique tchécoslovaque en Albanie en 1957,  eu l'occasion de prospecter le terrain sur place. La première partie présente un bref compte-rendu de sa part, tandis que les deux auteurs répondent en commun de la partie suivante dans laquelle ces observations sont appréciées et confrontées avec la littérature. Il s'agit de l'établissement du tracé de la route romaine Via Egnatia et de l'identification des stations mantionnées dans différents itinéraires, entre l'actuel Elbasan et le Lac d'Okhrida, donc dans un secteur en bien des endroits d'accès difficile, qui pour cela avait été jusqu'ici peu prospecté. D'Elbasan (l'antique Scampa) la route longeait tout d'abord la rive droite du Shkumbin jusqu'au pont appelé aujourd'hui Ura e Haxhi Bëgarit (eventuellement Beqarit; station Genesis flumen, eventuellement mutatio Treiecto). De là, elle poursuivait le long de la rive gauche du fleuve, à travers le massif Polis, jusqu'à la commune de Qukës, où elle rencontrait à nouveau le Shkumbin; elle le franchissait sur un pont dont les vestiges sont encore visibles. C'est à peu près au point culminant du passage à travers le massif Polis, près de la commune de Babjë, que se trouvait la station Ad Dianam (mansio Grandavia). Près du pont de Qukës se trouvait la station In Candavia (mutatio in Tabernas, Tres Tabernas). A propos de l'identification de ces stations et du tracé de la route d'Elbasan jusqu'à Qukës il ne peut y avoir de doute, et dans l'ensemble, les auteurs s'accordent à ce sujet avec Miller (Itineraria Romana) ainsi qu'avec les études du chercheur albanais Adam de 1953. Mais ils diffèrent foncièrement dans l'établissement du tracé du secteur suivant; ils estiment que la route ne passait par par l'affluent de rive droite du Shkumbin (Perroj i Lingajce), mais qu'aussitôt après le pont elle grimpait sur le massif, traversait le territoire des communes de Skroskë, Pishkash et Rajcë, après quoi elle ne rejoignait la route actuelle que sur les crêtes dominant le lac (Karakoll). C'est pourquoi ils situent la station Pons Servili vers le passage de la rivière dans la commune de Rajcë. Ils s'appuient ce faisant sur les trouvailles antiques de ce tracé (un fragment de statue de Skroskë, des pièces de monnaie au pied du Pishkash) ainsi que sur les traditions locales, mais avant tout sur les vestiges conservés de la route antique entre les communes de Pishkash et de Rajcë. — Sur le premier plan, la Via Egnatia est indiquée par une ligne interrompue (.—), sur le second, dessiné d'après une vue aérienne, son tracé est indiqué au pied du mont Pishkash.
 Walbank, Frank W. 2005. "The Via Egnatia: Its Role in Roman Strategy". Da Apollonia E Dyrracgium Ad Herakleia Lynkestidos. OCLC:  887098540.
 Werner, Louis. 2015. "Via Egnatia: To Rome and Byzantium. Saudi Aramco World. July/August 2015. Pages 20–31.
 XEIDAKIS, G. S., and E. G. VARAGOULI. 1997. "Design and Construction of Roman Roads: The Case of Via Egnatia in the Aegean Thrace, Northern Greece". Environmental & Engineering Geoscience. III, no. 1: 123–132. Abstract: Romans, the first real road designers, designed and constructed the first organized road system in Europe. This system was in use for almost 2,000 years with some parts still in use as secondary roads. Via Egnatia, the first highway to cross the Balkan Peninsula, was the first road built by Romans outside Italy. It was constructed in the second century B.C. The road began in Dyrrachium (modern Durrës), by the Adriatic sea, and passed through Serbia, Macedonia (Thessaliniki) and Thrace terminating at Cypsela (east of Evros river) and later extended up to Konstantinoupolis. The total length of the road from Dirrachium to Cypsela was about 750 km. From the study of sections of the road surviving in the Thrace region, Greece, it appears that the design and the construction of the road (in the area under discussion) was based on well-known specifications. Specifically, the road was always adapted to local topography, geomorphology and ground conditions. Thus the road avoided the difficult and unstable ground, the close curves and the steep grades. The thickness and the layering of the pavement varied according to the foundation conditions. In stable, rocky ground, the pavement consisted of only one layer of well-fitted cobble stones; whereas, in soft and unstable ground the soft soil was excavated and replaced by several layers of cobbles, gravels and rubbles held together with compacted sandy soil or lime mortar. Up to four stone layers have been found in an archaeological excavation in the road pavement in the Thrace area. Some layers were made waterproof by well-compacted clay soil. The thickness of the pavement varied from 25 cm to more than 150 cm. The materials used were mainly of local origin. The width of the road ranged from 4 m to 8 m, depending on the ground conditions and the traffic demand. In cities its width reached up to 20 m to accommodate the increased traffic. The horizontal curvature (curves) of the road was usually more than 100 m (R>100 m). Only in a few cases in mountainous areas curvatures of R = 10–20 m were found. The grade of the pavement normally was 1 to 2 percent, but in mountain regions gradients of 16 to 18 percent were observed. Gradients up to 20 percent were measured in a stretch of the road 2 km west of Kavala. The cross section of the pavement was convex, with grades perpendicular to its axis from 5 to 10 percent, for rapid drainage. Large rock blocks were placed at the sides of the pavement, raised above the surface, to prevent lateral spreading of the pavement and deterring carts and wagons from sliding off the road. A series of elongated rock blocks were constructed in the middle of the pavement, possibly for separating the opposite traffic. It is suggested that the remnants of this Roman road be preserved not only for their historic value, but also for their engineering significance. 
 Zachariadou, Elizabeth A. The Via Egnatia under Ottoman rule (1380–1699). Rethymnon: Crete University Press, 1996.

External links 
 

2nd-century BC establishments in the Roman Republic
2nd-century BC establishments
Albania in the Roman era
Ancient Roman buildings and structures in Greece
Byzantine Empire
History of Epirus
Roman fortifications in Greece
Macedonia (Roman province)
Egnatia, Via
Roman sites in Albania
Roman sites in Greece
Roman sites in North Macedonia
Roman sites in Turkey
Roman Thrace